The Sicilian Vespers was a rebellion on the island of Sicily that broke out in 1282.

Sicilian Vespers may also refer to:
 I vespri siciliani (The Sicilian Vespers), an opera by Giuseppe Verdi based on the historical event
 Night of the Sicilian Vespers, a group of mafia-related murders in New York City in 1931
 Operation Sicilian Vespers (disambiguation)
 War of the Sicilian Vespers, a conflict that started with the Sicilian Vespers

See also
 Cilician Vespers, a 1909 massacre in the Ottoman Empire
 Vespers (disambiguation)